Marinobacter halotolerans is a Gram-negative, moderately halophilic and motile bacterium from the genus of Marinobacter which has been isolated from the Yellow Sea on Korea.

References

External links
Type strain of Marinobacter halotolerans at BacDive -  the Bacterial Diversity Metadatabase

Alteromonadales
Bacteria described in 2017